Thomas Paul Frederick Dutton, known professionally as Tom Aspaul is a British singer and songwriter from Wolverhampton. He released his debut album, Black Country Disco in 2020 to critical acclaim. His songwriting credits include Kylie Minogue, Snakehips, Celeste and Becky Hill, amongst many others.

Early life
Tom grew up on a council estate in the Black Country. Writing songs from an early age, he would play ideas to family and friends, but was not involved in the local music scene. Instead, Aspaul went on to study Architecture, followed by a master's at Central Saint Martins College of Art and Design in London.

Music career

Songwriting
Tom's career in music began in earnest whilst still studying at University in London. Encountering several A&Rs and music managers during his shifts working in an East London pub, Aspaul was eventually drafted to help write new material for the newly reformed Sugababes (then known as Mutya Keisha Siobhan) in 2012. In October 2013, after uploading a demo to SoundCloud, his song "Indiana" was signed to Little Boots' label, On Repeat Records. Produced by MNEK, the single attracted support from Popjustice and Pitchfork. The song was covered and renamed as "Feels So Good" by Australian singer Kylie Minogue. Minogue included it on her twelfth studio album, Kiss Me Once, with Aspaul contributing backing vocals. Tom signed his first publishing deal soon after.

In September 2015, Tom co-wrote and featured on XYconstant's single, "Do It Well", released on FFRR Records/Parlophone in September 2015. The track was featured on several 'Best of 2015' lists, eventually being nominated for the 2016 Popjustice £20 Music Prize, an annual prize awarded by music website Popjustice, recognising the "best British pop single of the previous year". During this time, often in five songwriting sessions a week, Aspaul's other credits include writing singles for AlunaGeorge, LIZ, The X Factor thirteenth series winner Matt Terry (and the runner-up Saara Aalto), Snakehips and Celeste, amongst others.

2014–2019: Revelation, LEFT and collaborations

After the initial success of "Indiana", on 10 December 2014 Tom premiered "Good Together", his second official single and the first from his debut mixtape. The song, produced by GRADES, received support from Huw Stephens and was named by former BBC Radio 1 DJ, Zane Lowe as his "Next Hype". Revelation, the mixtape, was self-released via YouTube 19 May 2015, receiving acclaim from billboard. Also in 2015, Tom released his collaboration with Aeble (alias of producer Starsmith), "Better By Your Side", which went on to eventually amass over 20 million streams.

Tom released his first full EP, LEFT on BLK&WHT records on 4 November 2016, featuring work with frequent collaborators MNEK and GRADES. 2017 saw more collaborations, with Tom's vocals featuring on several EDM/dance and house tracks, including songs by Viceroy, Bronze Whale and Sleepy Tom, the latter of which became one of BBC Radio 1's "Dance Anthems".

2019–2021: Black Country Disco and Black Country Discothèque

On 14 September 2019, Tom announced the beginning of a new project, Black Country Disco - a concept album named for the area in which he grew up and inspired by disco from the late 70s and early 80s. The album was self-released in September 2020 to critical acclaim, hailed as "queer disco album of the year" by Gay Times, and named "easily one of the best albums of the year". The record was supported by a short-film titled Black Country Disco: The Movie, shot in and around Wolverhampton and made an official selection at Fringe! Queer Film & Arts Fest in November 2021.

Aspaul was awarded the PPL Momentum Fund in October 2020, sponsored by PRS, Spotify and Arts Council England to help fund a second studio album. He also performed the entirety of his debut album at Birmingham Symphony Hall as part of SHOUT Festival of Queer Arts & Culture.

In April 2021, Tom released Black Country Discothèque, a remix album re-imagining each song on his debut LP, including collaborations with MNEK, Kim Wilde, Brendan Maclean and Bright Light Bright Light. Later that month, Aspaul announced Black Country Disco: The Book, published by Polari Press, documenting the conception, creation and release of the album. Tom embarked on his first sold-out UK headline tour in July 2021, The Revenge Body Tour.

2021–present: Life In Plastic
On December 31 2021, Aspaul released the first single, "Let Them (It’s All Love)", from his second album, Life In Plastic.

Released May 30 2022 and named for a lyric taken from the song "Barbie Girl" by Danish-Norwegian dance-pop group Aqua, the album saw Aspaul team up with long-time collaborators, Gil Lewis and MNEK. The record was inspired by late 90s and early 00s Europop, trance and Eurodance music, noted for referencing artists such as "La Bouche, Ace of Base, Steps, Whigfield, ATC" and the band who inspired its name, Aqua - as well as Romanian pop music, Balkan pop music and the Eurovision Song Contest.

Described as a “monster pop record” and a “party from start to finish”, Life In Plastic received acclaim for its consistency and "Y2K aesthetic", as well its eclectic influences. For The Independent, Isobel Lewis wrote “Life in Plastic is a pure bubblegum pop record – but not without substance”. In Line of Best Fit, Aspaul was praised as a “shining example of an independent artist making the music they want to make”.

In support of the album’s release, Tom performed across the UK and Europe, including Mighty Hoopla, Prague Pride and the 2022 Commonwealth Games, held in Birmingham.

On October 17 2022, the album was re-released as Life In Plastic, It’s Expanded, a deluxe edition with 8 new tracks and a music video for the song “Thessaloniki”.

Artistry
Aspaul is a pop singer and songwriter, though his music has straddled pop, R&B and electronic/dance. Aspaul is noted for using vocal harmonies extensively and his songs often feature his own voice layered several times. His vocals have been described as having an "unapologetic queerness" as well as being "unique", "soulful", "smooth", "versatile" and "effortless". He frequently cites Rodney Jerkins, Janet Jackson and Jennifer Lopez amongst his favourite musicians, although more recently, the likes of La Roux, Empire of the Sun and Daft Punk have influenced his work stylistically - as well as Chic, Grace Jones and ELO.

Other work
Tom launched a music and pop culture podcast, Bottle Pop with Tom Aspaul in 2017. He is the host, with fellow singer/songwriter guests including MNEK, Becky Hill, Siobhan Donaghy, Anita Blay and Clare Maguire; as well as music journalist guests such as Popjustice. Since 2018 Tom has been sporadically presenting on the internet only radio station, FUBAR Radio. In 2020 he began hosting a weekly show on Gorgeous FM, an LGBTQ+ station for Birmingham, the Black Country and Shropshire. In 2021, Tom was part of United Kingdom's jury in the Eurovision Song Contest 2021.

Personal life
Aspaul is gay.

Discography

Studio albums

Remix albums

EPs

Mixtapes

Singles

As lead artist

As featured artist

Music videos

Songwriting credits
 indicates a background vocal contribution

 indicates an un-credited lead vocal contribution

 indicates a credited vocal/featured artist contribution

Awards and nominations

References

External links

Living people
Musicians from Wolverhampton
Alumni of Central Saint Martins
English male singer-songwriters
English LGBT singers
English LGBT songwriters
English podcasters
Gay songwriters
Gay singers
English gay musicians
1986 births